Sergi Mingote Moreno (9 March 1971 – 16 January 2021) was a Spanish mountaineer. He was also a lecturer and executive coach for The International School of Coaching. He held a diploma in managerial function from ESADE and Master in International Cooperation and Management of NGOs. He died while attempting to climb K2 in winter without supplementary oxygen.

While descending from around Camp 1, he fell down to Advanced Base Camp. His GPS tracker showing unnatural movements alerted the climbers at the Base Camp and at Advanced Base Camp. The unexpected movement on his GPS tracker showed that he made a big fall. Several climbers from ABC hurried up to the accident site and a medical team also rushed up from the Base Camp, but they failed to resuscitate Sergi.

He was attempting to set a record by climbing the fourteen 8000 metre peaks without the help of supplementary oxygen in less than 1000 days which was named as '14x1000 Catalonia Project'.

He was mayor of Parets del Vallès for the Socialists' Party of Catalonia between 2011 and 2018, when he left the mayor's office to focus on mountaineering.

References

1971 births
2021 deaths
Mayors of places in Catalonia
Mountaineering deaths on K2
Socialists' Party of Catalonia politicians
Spanish mountain climbers